The Avia Rk.17 was a 9-cylinder radial aircraft engine, developed from the 7-cylinder Avia Rk.12, with a rated output of 270 kW (360 hp). The Rk.17 was one of Avia's own designs and was built in Czechoslovakia in the 1930s.

Design and development
As well as producing aircraft and building Hispano-Suiza and Lorraine aero-engines under licence, Avia also designed and built their own radial engines.  The Rk.17 was a 9-cylinder supercharged model, rated at 360 hp.  It was a nine-cylinder version of their Rk.12.

It was a conventional air-cooled radial: nitrided steel barrels with integral fins were screwed into heat treated Y alloy heads.  The pistons were also of heat treated Y alloy.  The crankcase was cast from heat treated silumin alloy, with some minor parts using magnesium alloy.  The single throw two piece crankshaft was linked to the pistons with an I-section Y alloy master rod, with a single piece big end, which carried the other eight piston rods.

Applications
Avia Ba.122
Letov Š-50

Specifications

References

Further reading
  

1930s aircraft piston engines
Aircraft air-cooled radial piston engines